Laudelino Mejías, b. (Trujillo, Venezuela, August, 1893), d. (Caracas, Venezuela, November 30, 1963), was a Venezuelan composer, best known for the waltz Conticinio.

See also 
Conticinio
Venezuelan music
Venezuelan waltz

External links 
Venciclopedia: Laudelino Mejías
Venciclopedia: Conticinio

1893 births
1963 deaths
People from Caracas
Venezuelan composers
Male composers
Venezuelan folk musicians
20th-century composers
20th-century male musicians